Nokanan Dam  is an earthfill dam located in Hokkaido Prefecture in Japan. The dam is used for irrigation. The catchment area of the dam is 30 km2. The dam impounds about 37  ha of land when full and can store 4640 thousand cubic meters of water. The construction of the dam was started on 1969 and completed in 1978.

References

Dams in Hokkaido